The Broadway Boob is a 1926 American silent comedy film directed by Joseph Henabery and starring Glenn Hunter, Mildred Ryan, and Antrim Short.

Cast

References

Bibliography
 Munden, Kenneth White. The American Film Institute Catalog of Motion Pictures Produced in the United States, Part 1. University of California Press, 1997.

External links

Glass slide at www.worthpoint.com

1926 films
1926 comedy films
Silent American comedy films
Films directed by Joseph Henabery
American silent feature films
1920s English-language films
Associated Exhibitors films
American black-and-white films
1920s American films